Koiak 14 - Coptic Calendar - Koiak 16

The fifteenth day of the Coptic month of Koiak, the fourth month of the Coptic year. On a common year, this day corresponds to December 11, of the Julian Calendar, and December 24 of the Gregorian Calendar. This day falls in the Coptic season of Peret, the season of emergence. This day falls in the Nativity Fast.

Commemorations

Saints 

 The departure of Saint Gregory, Patriarch of the Armenians 
 The departure of Saint Lucas the Stylite 
 The departure of Saint Ezekiel of Armant

References 

Days of the Coptic calendar